Gratia is a genus of small minnow mayflies in the family Baetidae. There are at least two described species in Gratia.

Species
These two species belong to the genus Gratia:
 Gratia narumonae Boonsong, Thomas & Sangpradub, 2002 c g
 Gratia sororculaenadinae Thomas, 1992 c g
Data sources: i = ITIS, c = Catalogue of Life, g = GBIF, b = Bugguide.net

References

Further reading

 
 
 
 
 
 

Mayflies